Nicolás Santiago Prieto Correa (born 5 September 1992) is a Uruguayan professional footballer who plays as a defensive midfielder for Manta.

National
He has been capped by the Uruguay national under-20 football team for the 2011 South American Youth Championship and for the 2011 FIFA U-20 World Cup.

U20 International goals

|- bgcolor=#DFE7FF
| 1. || 14 October 2010 || Estadio 25 de Noviembre, Moquegua, Peru ||  || 2–1 || 2–1 || Friendly
|}

References

External links

1992 births
Living people
Uruguayan footballers
Uruguayan expatriate footballers
Uruguay under-20 international footballers
Uruguayan Primera División players
Ascenso MX players
Ecuadorian Serie A players
Club Nacional de Football players
Boston River players
Rampla Juniors players
Danubio F.C. players
Correcaminos UAT footballers
Manta F.C. footballers
Association football midfielders
Uruguayan expatriate sportspeople in Mexico
Uruguayan expatriate sportspeople in Ecuador
Expatriate footballers in Mexico
Expatriate footballers in Ecuador